The Strangler's Grip is a 1912 Australian silent film shot by Franklyn Barrett. It is considered a lost film.

Plot
The movie featured a "furious motor ride in the night"

Cast
Sidney Stirling as Squatter John Dalton 
Cyril Mackay as his friend Frank Wood
Leonard Willey as Mike Logan, the tramp
Chas Laurence as Old Simon, John's Butler
Master Willey as Bill Dalton, John's Son
Irby Marshall as Maurice Dalton, John's wife

Production
It is likely that the film was directed jointly by the three lead actors, Sydney Stirling, Cyril Mackay and Leonard Willey. It was the first of four movies they made for West's Pictures in 1912.  Cyril Mackay (d. 1923) was a London stage actor brought out to Australian by J.C. Williamson in 1906.

Reception
The film was described as being a "splendid draw" with the public. It was likely the first thriller film made in Australia.

Trivia
Willey and Irby Marshall were real life husband and wife. They later moved to the US and had successful stage careers there.

References

External links

1912 films
Australian drama films
Australian silent films
Australian black-and-white films
1912 drama films
Lost Australian films
1912 lost films
Lost drama films
Silent drama films